Robert James Calihan (August 2, 1918  – September 22, 1989) was an American basketball player and coach.

Calihan played for the University of Detroit from 1937 to 1940. He led his team in scoring during each of his three seasons and became the school's first All-American honoree in 1939. After graduating in 1940, he played professionally in the National Basketball League for the Detroit Eagles, Chicago American Gears, Syracuse Nationals and other teams. He became Detroit Mercy's basketball coach in 1948, and remained in that position until 1969. Over his coaching career, he posted a 360–237 record, leading his team to three NIT berths and an appearance in the 1962 NCAA Men's Division I Basketball Tournament. Detroit Mercy's Calihan Hall was named in his honor in 1977.

References

1918 births
1989 deaths
All-American college men's basketball players
American men's basketball coaches
American men's basketball players
Basketball coaches from Michigan
Basketball players from Detroit
Chicago American Gears players
Detroit Eagles players
Detroit Mercy Titans athletic directors
Detroit Mercy Titans men's basketball coaches
Detroit Mercy Titans men's basketball players
Flint Dow A.C.'s players
Forwards (basketball)
Guards (basketball)
People from Perry, Iowa
Professional Basketball League of America players
Syracuse Nationals players